Yendé-Millimou  is a sub-prefecture in the Kissidougou Prefecture in the Faranah Region of Guinea. It includes the settlements of Yendé and Millimou. As of 2014 it had a population of 20,372 people.

References

Sub-prefectures of the Faranah Region